William Peter McGirr (12 December 1859 – 6 May 1934) was a New Zealand cricketer who played first-class cricket for Wellington from 1883 to 1890. 

He was born in Melbourne, and migrated with his family to New Zealand when he was 10. He worked as a compositor with the Government Printing Office in Wellington for 40 years till he retired in 1915.

In his best bowling performance he took 3 for 21 and 6 for 36 against Canterbury at the Basin Reserve in 1886-87, but Canterbury dismissed Wellington for 65 and 34 and won by 111 runs.

One of his sons, Herb, played Test cricket for New Zealand, and another son, Les, represented New Zealand at soccer.

References

External links

1859 births
1934 deaths
New Zealand cricketers
Wellington cricketers
Cricketers from Melbourne